Sunitha Tati is an Indian film producer who produces Telugu films under Guru Films. Her notable productions include Oh! Baby, Courier Boy Kalyan and Sahasame Swasaga Sagipo.

Early life
Tati was born and brought up in Vijayawada. She completed her bachelor's degree in business management from George Mason University and went on to do her PG course in film-making from New York University.

Career
Before starting out in the Telugu movie industry, Tati worked in TV9 (Telugu) as well as Radio Mirchi. She worked under D. Suresh Babu of Ramanaidu Studios and worked as an assistant director of various movies including Malliswari, Jayam Manadera and Nagesh Kukunoor’s Hyderabad Blues.

In 2016, she worked with Gautham Vasudev Menon as a producer for Achcham Yenbadhu Madamaiyada and also its Telugu version Sahasam Swasaga Sagipo.  In 2019, she produced B. V. Nandini Reddy-directed Oh! Baby, starring Samantha Akkineni and Lakshmi, along with People’s Media Productions and Suresh Productions.

Her upcoming film, Saakini Daakini is directed by Sudheer Varma. Starring Regina Cassandra and Nivetha Thomas, the film is a remake of the Korean film Midnight Runners. As of August 2021, she is also working on the comedy film Dongalunnaru Jaagratha in a collaboration with Suresh Productions, Written and directed by Satish Tripura, the film stars Sri Simha and Samuthirakani.

Other Work
Apart from movies, Tati is an active Rotarian. She also serves as a trustee and founder member of Support Cancer Awareness Foundation, a NGO based in Hyderabad.

Filmography

Television

Awards and nominations

References

External links
 

Living people
Indian women television producers
Indian television producers
Film directors from Andhra Pradesh
Film producers from Andhra Pradesh
Indian women film producers
Businesspeople from Vijayawada
Telugu film producers
Women artists from Andhra Pradesh
Telugu film directors
21st-century Indian film directors
Businesswomen from Andhra Pradesh
Women television producers
Year of birth missing (living people)
Film producers from Hyderabad, India